The Bank of Joseon (Korean: 조선은행) or Bank of Chosen (Japanese: 朝鮮銀行) was the central bank of Colonial Korea, and of South Korea.  The bank issued the Korean yen from 1910 to 1945 and the won from 1945 to 1950.

History and background 

The bank was established by the Governor-General of Korea in 1910 as the Kankoku Ginkō, taking the place of the privately held Korean branch of Daiichi Kokuritsu Ginkō (First National Bank), which had established a branch in 1878. The Bank of Korea assumed responsibility for the banknotes issued by the Dai-Ichi Bank that were still in circulation (which totalled 12,000,000 yen), the Dai-Ichi Bank would further transfer to the Bank of Korea the 4,000,000 yen in specie reserves which backed its banknotes. The balance was converted by the Bank of Korea to a loan of 20 years without interest to the Dai-Ichi Bank.

After the annexation of Korean Empire by Japan in 1910, the bank was reorganized and its name was changed to reflect the official name for Korea.

The bank remained a privately held corporation with stock owned by a number of Japanese banks and companies; however, its board was appointed by the Governor-General of Korea.

The bank was responsible for issuing currency in Korea, regulated domestic prices, and serviced international trade with branches in Manchukuo, and major ports in China and in Japan, as well as in London and New York City.

The bank was dissolved in 1950 and replaced by the newly formed Bank of Korea.

Tasks

Role as issuing bank 
It played a role as a colonial issuing bank that issues banknotes, which are legal currency exchanged one-to-one with Japanese banknotes.

Therefore, the bank held more than a third of its issuance amount in reserves consisting of Japanese bank notes and gold and silver now. However, the total issuance of banknotes increased from 25 million won at the end of 1911 to 3.574 billion won in March 1945 by adjusting the amount of other issuance according to the bill issuance limit designated by Japan.

Role as a commercial bank 
In addition to handling foreign exchange transactions between Japan, Korea, Manchuria, and China, it played a role as a commercial and trade bank by taking charge of deposits and loans in the region. In the Joseon Dynasty alone, 9 million won in 1911 and 755 million won in 1944 were loaned, while commercial loans accounted for 60-70%. Also, the amount of deposits increased from 6 million won in 1911 to 583 million won in 1944. However, unlike the Bank of Japan, it was in a competitive position in loans and deposits with other banks.

Role as an overseas bank 
It expanded its business as a general bank in Japan, Manchuria and China to promote foreign investment of Japanese capital. In other words, from mid-1910, while expanding loans in Japan and Manchuria, they participated in Japanese loans to China and allocated more than 50% of all loans to the region. At the end of 1924, the loan amount reached 80 million won in Joseon, 1.75 billion won in Japan, and 1.25 billion won in Manchuria.

See also

 Korean Yen

References

External links 

 Bank of Korea, A Brief History of Korean Currency (404: 2013-04-16)

Korea
Defunct companies of Japan
1910 establishments in Korea
1950 disestablishments in Korea
Banks established in 1910
Banks disestablished in 1950
Economy of Korea under Japanese rule